Earl Turner may refer to:

Earl Turner (baseball) (1923–1999), Major League Baseball player
Earl Turner (film editor) (1884–1971)
Earl Turner, fictional character in The Turner Diaries